Musical! Die Show (Musical! The Show) is a television musical talent show produced by the ORF, an Austrian public TV-broadcaster.  The finals took place on January 11, 2008, in which Vincent Bueno was hailed as the winner.

Programme
The broadcasting of the programme began in September 2007. Many interested ones joined audition. Through advance ones were the best 10 of the jurors selected.

External links
 "Musical! Die Show" Homepage

References

Austrian television series
ORF (broadcaster) original programming